Khaled Ahmed Saad al-Wesabi (born 1973 in Dhamar) is a Yemeni politician and current minister of Higher Education and Scientific Research and Technical Education and Vocational in the cabinet of Yemen since 18 December 2020.

See also 

 Cabinet of Yemen
 Politics of Yemen

References 

21st-century Yemeni politicians
Higher education ministers of Yemen
1973 births
Living people
Yemeni academics
Second Maeen Cabinet
People from Dhamar Governorate